The Comptroller and Auditor General or C&AG is an office established by the States of Jersey, under the Public Finances (Jersey) Law 2005. The office is independent to the government, and is responsible for auditing most of Jersey's public organisations, including States' departments.

Its duties include ensuring public finances are managed to the highest standards.

History
Chris Swinson was Comptroller and Auditor General for Jersey until his resignation in June 2012.

See also
 Comptroller and Auditor General

References

Organisations based in Jersey
Jersey
2005 establishments in Jersey